Dhanashree Halbe(born December 13, 1928) is a Marathi writer and translator.

References 

1928 births
Living people
Marathi-language writers
20th-century Indian translators
Indian women translators
Women writers from Maharashtra
20th-century Indian short story writers
Indian women short story writers
20th-century Indian women writers